The 2013 season of the Polish American Football League was the eighth season played by the american football leagues in Poland.

Regular season of the Topliga took place between March 23 and June 23, 2013. The Polish champion was determined in the play-off final - the VIII SuperFinal PLFA (known as the Polish Bowl VIII). The Giants Wrocław beat the Warsaw Eagles in the championship game 29–13 hosted at the National Stadium in Warsaw.

Topliga

Results table

Standings

Postseason

PLFA I

Standings

Postseason

See also
 2013 in sports

References

External links
 Polish American Football Association

Polish American Football League seasons
Poland
PLFA